David Nathaniel Lowe Jr. (born July 7, 1995) is an American professional baseball first baseman for the Texas Rangers of Major League Baseball (MLB). He previously played in MLB for the Tampa Bay Rays.

Amateur career
Lowe attended Pope High School in Marietta, Georgia. He enrolled at Mercer University and played college baseball for the Mercer Bears in 2014. He transferred to St. Johns River State College for the 2015 season, and transferred to Mississippi State University to play for the Mississippi State Bulldogs for 2016. That year, he was named a Second Team All-American by Louisville Slugger.

Professional career

Tampa Bay Rays
The Rays selected Lowe in the 13th round, with the 390th overall selection, of the 2016 MLB draft. He signed and made his professional debut with the Hudson Valley Renegades of the Class A Short Season New York-Penn League, batting .300/.382/.437 with four home runs and 40 runs batted in (RBIs) in 67 games. He played for both the Bowling Green Hot Rods of the Class A Midwest League and the Charlotte Stone Crabs of the Class A-Advanced Florida State League in 2017, hitting .274 with seven home runs and 59 RBIs in 115 games between both teams.

Lowe began the 2018 season with Charlotte. He received a midseason promotion to the Montgomery Biscuits of the Class AA Southern League, and was named to represent the Rays in the 2018 All-Star Futures Game. The Rays promoted Lowe again, to the Durham Bulls of the Class AAA International League, in August. Lowe was named to the 2018 MLB Pipeline team of the year after hitting .330/.416/.568 with 27 home runs and 102 RBIs in 130 games between the three clubs. He returned to Durham to begin 2019.

The Rays promoted Lowe to the major leagues on April 29, 2019. On July 5, 2019 he hit his first major league home run against the New York Yankees. On July 13, 2019 Lowe recorded his first multi home run game. In 2020 for the Rays, Lowe appeared in 21 games, slashing .224/.316/.433 with 4 home runs 11 RBIs in 76 at-bats.

Texas Rangers
On December 10, 2020, the Rays traded Lowe to the Texas Rangers along with Jake Guenther and Carl Chester in exchange for Heriberto Hernandez, Osleivis Basabe, and Alexander Ovalles.

2021
Over 157 games in 2021, Lowe hit .264/.357/.415/.771 with 18 home runs and 72 RBIs.

2022
On June 15, 2022, Lowe became the first major leaguer to strike out in two immaculate innings in one game versus the Houston Astros.  It was also the first occurrence in major league history of more than one immaculate inning thrown on the same date.  The first was hurled in the second inning by starter Luis Garcia and the second in the seventh inning by reliever Phil Maton.

Lowe hit into 3–6 triple play in the fourth inning on August 22, lining out to Minnesota Twins first baseman José Miranda, who put out Corey Seager and threw to shortstop Carlos Correa to put out Marcus Semien at second base. For the week ending August 28, 2022, Lowe was named AL Player of the Week.  In six games, he batted .385/.407/.923/1.331 (10-for-26) with four home runs and 11 RBI  He led all MLB players in RBI, home runs (tied), and total bases (tied-24). 

Lowe finished the 2022 season hitting .302/.358/.492/.851 with 27 home runs and 76 RBI. He received the 2022 American League Silver Slugger Award for first basemen.

On January 13, 2023, Lowe agreed to a one-year, $4.05 million contract with the Rangers for the 2023 season, avoiding salary arbitration.

Personal life
His brother, Josh Lowe, plays in the Rays organization. They were teammates with Bowling Green and Charlotte. His father, David, was drafted by the Seattle Mariners in the 1986 MLB Draft, but instead attended the U.S. Naval Academy and became a Naval Aviator and career fighter pilot in the U.S. Navy.

References

External links

1995 births
Living people
Baseball players from Norfolk, Virginia
Baseball players from Marietta, Georgia
Major League Baseball first basemen
Silver Slugger Award winners
Tampa Bay Rays players
Texas Rangers players
Mercer Bears baseball players
St. Johns River State Vikings baseball players
Mississippi State Bulldogs baseball players
Hudson Valley Renegades players
Bowling Green Hot Rods players
Charlotte Stone Crabs players
Montgomery Biscuits players
Durham Bulls players
Leones del Escogido players
American expatriate baseball players in the Dominican Republic